Scopula monotropa is a moth of the  family Geometridae. It is found in Namibia.

References

Moths described in 1925
monotropa
Moths of Africa